Daniel M. Ewing (born 3 June 1985), is an Australian actor. He appeared on Seven Network's Home and Away series as Reuben Humphries during 2007. In 2011, he returned to the Australian soap, this time receiving a larger role, playing Heath Braxton. He is also known for portraying Dillon in Power Rangers RPM.

Early life
Ewing was born in Manly and grew up in Forestville. He is the eldest of four children. Ewing attended Marist Catholic College North Shore, where he took part in various musicals. Ewing played representative basketball for Manly Warringah and he took part in two state championships and toured the U.S. and Canada. Ewing was a part-time student at NIDA, attending the Open Program courses.

Career
Ewing appeared in Home and Away as Reuben Humpheries in 2007. He has also had guest roles in Blue Water High, Spirited and Rescue: Special Ops. Ewing secured a role as Dillon the Black RPM Ranger in children's television series Power Rangers RPM.

In September 2010, Ewing joined the cast of Home and Away again, this time as Heath Braxton. The actor made his debut in February 2011. Ewing also became a contestant on the 11th season of Dancing with the Stars. He was partnered with Luda Kroiter, and danced in support of the St Vincent de Paul Society, where his mother works. Ewing and Kroiter were eliminated in week five. On 9 December 2013, Ewing confirmed that he would be leaving Home and Away, and made his on-screen departure during the following year.

Ewing reprised his role as Heath Braxton for the feature-length special, Home and Away: An Eye for an Eye, along with co-star Lisa Gormley (Bianca Scott). In 2016, Ewing returned to Home and Away, along with Gormley. Both Ewing and Gormley starred in the feature-length specials Home and Away: Revenge and Home and Away: All or Nothing. Ewing also starred in the Australian feature film Red Billabong, alongside Tim Pocock. He has roles in Dunamis, and Chasing Comets.

In 2018, Ewing starred in horror film Beast No More, and the sci-fi action film Occupation, alongside Temuera Morrison. He filmed an appearance in the sci-fi thriller 1, directed by Robert Braiden, and made a guest appearance in the ninth episode of Harrow. In April 2019, Ewing joined the cast of Love and Monsters. He will reprise his Occupation role of Matt Simmons in the 2021 sequel Occupation: Rainfall.

Personal life
Ewing became engaged to Marni Little in September 2011, and they married on 15 December 2012. Little gave birth to their son in September 2014. The couple announced their separation in 2016.

Ewing has been in a relationship with actress Kat Risteska since August 2016. He announced their engagement on 24 December 2021. In March 2022, they confirmed they were expecting their first child together, and Risteska gave birth to their daughter on 22 July 2022.

On 21 October 2018, Ewing allegedly assaulted Little's husband David Robertshaw during a custody swap of their son. Ewing and Robertshaw argued for almost an hour while keeping his son locked in the car, before the police were called to the scene. Ewing was given an apprehended violence order (AVO) and faced Manly Local Court on 6 November 2018. On 3 November 2018, Ewing was handed another AVO, this time to keep away from Little's home and was due to attend Manly Local Court on 13 November 2018.

Filmography

Theatre

References

External links

 
 Dan Ewing at johnsonlaird.com

1985 births
21st-century Australian male actors
Australian male television actors
Living people
Male actors from New South Wales
People from Manly, New South Wales